Blaise Louembé (born 20 February 1960) is a Gabonese political figure. He served in the government of Gabon as Minister of the Economy, Finance, the Budget, and Privatization from 2008 to 2009 and was appointed as Minister of the Budget, Public Accounts, the Civil Service, and State Reform in October 2009. Since February 2014 he has served as Minister of Youth, Sports and Leisure.

Born in Koulamoutou, Blaise Louembe was Paymaster-General of Gabon from 22 March 2000 until he was appointed to the government as Minister of the Economy, Finance, the Budget, and Privatization on 7 October 2008. When Ali Bongo took office as President, he retained Louembe in the government but modified his portfolio, appointing him as Minister of the Budget, Public Accounts, and the Civil Service, in charge of State Reform, on 17 October 2009.

Blaise Louembe is also a businessman who own restaurants, estate, and a private channel called Kanal 7.

References

Living people
1960 births
Government ministers of Gabon
Finance ministers of Gabon
Gabonese businesspeople
People from Ogooué-Lolo Province
21st-century Gabonese people